Roald Glacier is a glacier which flows from the vicinity of Mount Noble and Mount Sladen eastward into Gibbon Bay, on the east coast of Coronation Island in the South Orkney Islands. Chartered and named by the Norwegian whaling captain Petter Sorle in the period 1912–15. Surveyed in 1948-49 by the Falkland Islands Dependencies Survey (FIDS).

See also
 List of glaciers in the Antarctic
 Glaciology

Glaciers of the South Orkney Islands